An imago (plural: imagines or imagoes) is the last (or adult) stage of development of an insect.

Imago may also refer to:

Psychology 
American Imago, academic journal founded in 1939 by Sigmund Freud and Hanns Sachs
A term coined by Carl Jung to describe a way that people form their personality by identifying with the collective unconscious

Poetry 
"Imago", a poem by Wallace Stevens in his 1950 book The Auroras of Autumn
"Imago", a poem by Patti Smith from her 1996 book The Coral Sea

Fiction 
Imago, a science fiction novel by Octavia E. Butler; part of the Xenogenesis Trilogy
Imago, a mutant fly-like boss in Metroid: Zero Mission
Imago, the ability to utilize the two-way brain-computer interface in Dennō Coil
Imago (1970 film), an American film directed by Ned Bosnick
Imago (2001 film), a French film directed by Marie Vermillard
Imago (2016 film), a Philippine film directed by Raymund Ribay Gutierrez

Music 
Imago Records, an independent record label active in the early 1990s
Imago (band), a Filipino pop rock band
Imago (The Butterfly Effect album), 2006
Imago (2002 Catharsis album)
Imago (2003 Catharsis album), the Russian version of the 2002 album
Imago, a 1999 album by Rovo
"Imago (Homines Partus)", a song by Pain of Salvation from BE
"Imago", a song by The Mars Volta from Noctourniquet

Other uses 
Imago Scientific Instruments, a Madison, Wisconsin-based company that produces atom probe tomographs
Imago, a typeface designed by Günter Gerhard Lange in 1982

See also 
Imago dei
Imago Therapy or Imago Relationship Therapy (IRT), a form of marriage therapy founded by Harville Hendrix, Ph.D.
Imagon (disambiguation)